Iosif Ioan Stibinger (also known as János Stibinger or János Barna; 24 September 1923 – 17 June 1949) was a Romanian football player who played as a striker at international level for Romania.

Club career
Iosif Stibinger was born on 24 September 1923 in Reșița, Romania and made his senior debut at Hungarian team, Elektromos at age 18. After one year he went to play for Nagyváradi AC in Crișana, which that time was occupied by Hungary, winning the 1943–44 Nemzeti Bajnokság I, contributing with 3 goals scored in 20 matches. In 1945, he returned to play for one year at Elektromos, before going to play for ITA Arad where he made his Divizia A debut on 11 May 1947 in a 1–1 against CFR București. Stibinger scored 4 goals in 6 matches in his first season spent at ITA, helping the club win the Divizia A title and in the following season he helped the club win The Double, scoring 12 goals in 26 Divizia A matches, including managing he and teammate Adalbert Kovács to score each a hat-trick on 7 March 1948 in a 6–1 away victory against CSCA București, it was the first time that two players from the same team scored a hat-trick in a Divizia A match. Iosif Stibinger made his last Divizia A appearance in a 4–1 victory against CFR Cluj, having a total of 50 Divizia A games played and 19 goals scored, all for ITA Arad. He died in the summer of 1949 at age 25, being ill of jaundice.

International career
Iosif Stibinger played two games for Romania at international level, making his debut under coach Colea Vâlcov in a 3–1 loss against Yugoslavia at the 1947 Balkan Cup, played on the Giulești Stadium from Bucharest. His second and last appearance also took place on the Giulești Stadium in a 1–0 loss against Albania at the 1948 Balkan Cup.

Honours
Nagyváradi AC
Nemzeti Bajnokság I: 1943–44
ITA Arad
Divizia A: 1946–47, 1947–48
Cupa României: 1947–48

References

1923 births
1949 deaths
Sportspeople from Reșița
Romanian footballers
Association football forwards
CA Oradea players
FC UTA Arad players
Liga I players
Nemzeti Bajnokság I players
Romania international footballers
Romanian expatriate footballers
Romanian expatriate sportspeople in Hungary
Expatriate footballers in Hungary